Juan de Dios Navarro Ramírez (born 18 July 1984) is a Mexican former boxer who represented his country in the 2004 Summer Olympics.

Amateur career
Navarro was defeated in the first round of the Light welterweight (54 kg) division of the 2004 Summer Olympics by Kazakhstan's Nurzhan Karimzhanov.

Navarro won the bronze medal in the same division one year earlier, at the Pan American Games in Santo Domingo. He qualified for the Olympic Games by ending up in first place at the 1st AIBA American 2004 Olympic Qualifying Tournament in Tijuana, Mexico. He defeated Cuban Yudel Jhonson and Argentinian Marcos Maidana.

Professional career
He has a record of 4 wins and no losses.

References

External links
Yahoo! Sports

1984 births
Living people
Boxers from Tlaxcala
Welterweight boxers
Boxers at the 2003 Pan American Games
Boxers at the 2004 Summer Olympics
Olympic boxers of Mexico
Mexican male boxers
Pan American Games bronze medalists for Mexico
Pan American Games medalists in boxing
Medalists at the 2003 Pan American Games